Eisenberg is a German name in geography and a surname. Literally translated it means ″iron mountain″. Eisenberg may refer to:

Mountains
 Eisenberg (Knüll), a mountain in Hesse
 Eisenberg (Korbach), a mountain in Hesse
 Eisenberg (Ore Mountains), a mountain in Saxony

Populated places

In Germany
Eisenberg, Thuringia, a town in the Saale-Holzland district, Thuringia
Eisenberg, Rhineland-Palatinate, a town in the Donnersbergkreis, Rhineland-Palatinate
Eisenberg (Verbandsgemeinde), a collective municipality in the Donnersbergkreis, Rhineland-Palatinate
Eisenberg, Bavaria, a municipality in the district of Ostallgäu in Bavaria
 Eisenberg Castle, Korbach, Hesse, former seat of the House of Waldeck

In Austria
Eisenberg an der Raab, a town in Burgenland.
Deutsch Schützen-Eisenberg, a municipality in Burgenland.

in Poland
 Eisenberg, Kreis Sprottau/Schlesien, today Rudawica 
 Eisenberg, Kreis Heiligenbeil/Ostpreußen, today Żelazna Góra
 Eisenberg, Kreis Strehlen/Schlesien, today Żeleźnik

In the Czech Republic
Eisenberg, Eisenberg an der March, Nieder Eisenberg, previous German names of Ruda nad Moravou in Moravia
  (German: Schloss Eisenberg), Most District

Other uses
 Eisenberg (surname)
 Eisenberg Paris

See also 
 Eisenberger
 Heisenberg
 Isenberg
 Vashegy (disambiguation), a Hungarian place name corresponding to the German Eisenberg, for some of which Eisenberg is an exonym